Idaea dilutaria, also called the silky wave,  is a moth of the family Geometridae. It is found in Europe.

The species has a wingspan of 20–22 mm.Recognizable by its strongly silky gloss, the absence of costal colouration (the costal margin has
merely a sparse dusting of dark scales), the unmarked distal margin and fringe.The ground-colour is yellowish-tinted the discal dots are minute and there are no terminal lines.The other lines are generally all of approximately equal expression, sometimes the postmedian a little stronger, sometimes the median of the forewing weak.The underside is similar, the postmedian line often a little stronger, theantemedian and sometimes the median of the forewing obsolete. The males antennal ciliation is short and even. 

The adults fly in one generation in July .

The larvae feed on Helianthemum nummularium.

Notes
The flight season refers to the British Isles. This may vary in other parts of the range.

References

External links

Silky Wave at UK Moths
Fauna Europaea
Lepiforum.de

Sterrhini
Moths of Europe
Moths described in 1799
Taxa named by Jacob Hübner